Country Club is a village in Andrew County, Missouri, United States. The population was 2,449 at the 2010 census. It is part of the St. Joseph, MO–KS Metropolitan Statistical Area.

Geography
Country Club is located at  (39.821994, -94.826292).

Demographics

2010 census
As of the census of 2010, there were 2,449 people, 960 households, and 721 families living in the village. The racial makeup of the village was 95.1% White, 1.6% African American, 0.5% Native American, 0.6% Asian, 0.4% from other races, and 1.7% from two or more races. Hispanic or Latino of any race were 3.1% of the population.

There were 960 households, of which 31.6% had children under the age of 18 living with them, 61.4% were married couples living together, 9.0% had a female householder with no husband present, 4.8% had a male householder with no wife present, and 24.9% were non-families. 19.0% of all households were made up of individuals, and 7.3% had someone living alone who was 65 years of age or older. The average household size was 2.55 and the average family size was 2.89.

The median age in the village was 39.6 years. 22.3% of residents were under the age of 18; 9.4% were between the ages of 18 and 24; 24.7% were from 25 to 44; 29.8% were from 45 to 64; and 13.8% were 65 years of age or older. The gender makeup of the village was 48.9% male and 51.1% female.

2000 census
As of the census of 2000, there were 1,846 people, 684 households, and 521 families living in the village. The population density was 1,580.3 people per square mile (609.2/km2). There were 703 housing units at an average density of 601.8 per square mile (232.0/km2). The racial makeup of the village was 97.18% White, 1.73% African American, 0.16% Native American, 0.27% Asian, 0.38% from other races, and 0.27% from two or more races. Hispanic or Latino of any race were 1.08% of the population.

There were 684 households, out of which 38.7% had children under the age of 18 living with them, 63.7% were married couples living together, 8.9% had a female householder with no husband present, and 23.7% were non-families. 18.9% of all households were made up of individuals, and 6.9% had someone living alone who was 65 years of age or older. The average household size was 2.70 and the average family size was 3.08.

In the village, the population was spread out, with 27.7% under the age of 18, 8.8% from 18 to 24, 29.5% from 25 to 44, 23.6% from 45 to 64, and 10.3% who were 65 years of age or older. The median age was 35 years. For every 100 females, there were 95.8 males. For every 100 females age 18 and over, there were 94.5 males.

The median income for a household in the village was $45,987, and the median income for a family was $50,789. Males had a median income of $35,326 versus $23,182 for females. The per capita income for the village was $19,871. About 2.9% of families and 3.1% of the population were below the poverty line, including 2.8% of those under age 18 and 1.1% of those age 65 or over.

References

Villages in Andrew County, Missouri
St. Joseph, Missouri metropolitan area
Villages in Missouri